The 12393 / 12394 Sampoorna Kranti Express is an Indian Railways Express passenger train service, which runs between Rajendra Nagar, Patna and . The service began running on 16 February 2002 and is one of the fastest train services in India, traversing the 1001-kilometre distance in under 12 hours, which puts it with likes of Patna Rajdhani Express, Dibrugarh Rajdhani Express, Agartala Rajdhani Express, Howrah Rajdhani Express. It is faster than the Shramjeevi Superfast Express, Magadh Express and Vikramshila Express on the same route. This train is also known as "Aam Janta ki Rajdhani" as its fare is less than that of Rajdhani Express but matches it in speed and punctuality (although Patna Rajdhani Express travels ten minutes faster than this train between New Delhi and Patna). It is quicker than few Premier Rajdhani Express Trains on Pandit Deen Dayal Upadhyaya Junction–New Delhi section.

The train is named in memory of the Sampoorna Kranti, that began in Bihar.

Service 
It has LHB coach. It is now operated on HOG system in which the power to coaches is provided directly from locomotive instead of EOGs (power cars). It is the first Superfast train in India to have a LHB rake. During its run with ICF coach it ran with the maximum length permitted in Indian Railway of 24 coaches. It is among the top priority trains of Indian Railways and does speeds of 130 km/hour from 8 August 2015.

This train has many firsts to its name-

 1st Non-AC Superfast train to get LHB coach.
 1st Non-AC Superfast train to run at a maximum speed of 130 km/h.

Schedule 
As per latest schedule,

12393 departs Rajendra Nagar every day at 07.25 PM IST and arrives New Delhi at 07.55 AM IST. It takes 12 hours 30 mins.
12394 departs New Delhi every day at 05.30 PM IST and arrives Rajendra Nagar at 07.20 AM IST. It takes 13 hours 50 mins.

Route and halts

Coaches 
This train has 22 LHB coach and carries a High Capacity Parcel Van

1 AC First Class (H1)
2 AC Two Tier (A1 and A2)
6 AC Three Tier (B1 to B6)
6 Sleeper (S1 to S6)
3 Unreserved coaches
Pantry car (AC hot buffet car)

Traction 
Both trains are hauled by a Gomoh Loco Shed or Samastipur Loco Shed-based WAP-7 locomotive from end to end.

See also 
Sanghamithra Express
Bhagmati Express
List of named passenger trains of India
Indian Railways coaching stock

References 

Transport in Patna
Transport in Delhi
Rail transport in Bihar
Rail transport in Uttar Pradesh
Rail transport in Delhi
Rail transport in Rajasthan
Railway services introduced in 2002
Express trains in India
Named passenger trains of India